The Ministry of Culture of the Russian Federation is a ministry of the Government of Russia responsible for state policy in cultural spheres such as art, cinematography, archives, copyright, cultural heritage, and censorship.

Olga Lyubimova has been Minister of Culture since 21 January 2020.

Structure 
The current Ministry of Culture was formed on May 2, 2008 from the Ministry for Culture and Mass Media (Министерство культуры и массовых коммуникаций Российской Федерации). In the past, the Ministry of Culture operated between 1953 to 2004, while between March and September 1992 the ministry was known as the Ministry for Culture and Tourism (Министерство культуры и туризма Российской Федерации).

The Federal Service for Supervision over Cultural Heritage Protection (Федеральная служба по надзору за соблюдением законодательства в области охраны культурного наследия; Росохранкультура) was dissolved in 2011.
 Federal Archive Agency (Федеральное архивное агентство; Росархив)

Authority 
The Ministry of Culture independently carries out legal regulations, as well as develops and introduces draft regulations on the following issues: culture, art, cinematography, copyright, related rights, historical and cultural heritage, international cultural and informational cooperation.

Ministers of Culture

References

External links 

  

Culture, Ministry of
Russia
Ministries established in 2008
2008 establishments in Russia